Jason Schneiderman (born 1976) is an American poet.

Life
Jason Schneiderman has BA degrees in English and Russian from the University of Maryland, an MFA in poetry from NYU, and a Ph.D. in English Literature with a focus on Queer Theory from the Graduate Center, CUNY.  He is an associate professor at Borough of Manhattan Community College.,[2] and has taught in the MFA Program for Writers at Warren Wilson College. He was a featured faculty member at the 2018 Conference on Poetry at The Frost Place. He lives in Brooklyn. He is one of the hosts of Painted Bride Quarterly Slush Pile, a podcast that puts an editorial meeting on the air.

He is one of the hosts of Monday Night Poetry at KGB Bar, a longstanding reading series in New York City.

Schneiderman's essays on teaching formal poetry have appeared in Teachers and Writers. His essays on poetry have frequently appeared in American Poetry Review. The anthology Queer: A Reader for Writers was the first Freshman composition reader focused on LGBTIAQ topics.

Books
 Link
 Link 
 Link

Awards
 Fulbright Fellow, Spring 2022 (postponed for the Pandemic)
 The Shestack Award from American Poetry Review, 2015
 The Benjamin Saltman Prize from Red Hen Press, 2015
 The Fine Arts Work Center Fellowships
 Bread Loaf Writers’ Conference Fellowships
 Yaddo Fellowships
 2004 Writer Magazine/Emily Dickinson Award

Works
"Nothingism:  A Manifesto"
"Charlie Brown in a Well"; "A Story about Nutrition"; "Hydration", La Petite Zine
"Oracular", Starting Today: Poems for the First 100 Days
"Fertile: Sterile:: My Father: Me", American Poetry Review
"Jokes About Nuns", American Poetry Review
"Buffy's Sestina", McSweeney's]
"The Other Side", Prairie Schooner, Winter 2008
"Sublimation Point", Poetry foundation
"Elegy for Lee", 42 Opus
"Four Poems", American Poetry Review[http://aprweb.org/poems/the-sadness-of-antonio The Sadness of Antonio, If you died, My Maiden Aunt Is Smoking Again, White Boy

Anthologies

References

External links
"Author's website"

1976 births
Living people
Writers from New York City
University of Maryland, College Park alumni
New York University alumni
Hunter College faculty
Hofstra University faculty
American male poets
American gay writers
21st-century American poets
21st-century American male writers
American LGBT poets
Gay poets